Hideki Uda (born 6 April 1987) is a Japanese Paralympic triathlete. At the 2020 Summer Paralympics, he won a silver medal in the Men's PTS4 event.

References

External links
 

1987 births
Living people
Japanese male triathletes
Paratriathletes of Japan
Paralympic silver medalists for Japan
Paralympic medalists in paratriathlon
Paratriathletes at the 2020 Summer Paralympics
Medalists at the 2020 Summer Paralympics
Place of birth missing (living people)
20th-century Japanese people
21st-century Japanese people